Senator Tompkins may refer to:

Bernard Tompkins (1904–1965), New York State Senate
Edward Tompkins (1815–1872), California State Senate
Minthorne Tompkins (1807–1881), New York State Senate
Nathaniel Tompkins (1879–1949), Maine State Senate